Komsomolets is a rural locality (a selo) in Leninskoye Rural Settlement, Nikolayevsky District, Volgograd Oblast, Russia. The population was 915 as of 2010. There are 12 streets.

Geography 
Komsomolets is located in steppe, on the left bank of the Volgograd Reservoir, on the bank of Zavolzhsky Canal, 24 km southeast of Nikolayevsk (the district's administrative centre) by road. Leninskoye is the nearest rural locality.

References 

Rural localities in Nikolayevsky District, Volgograd Oblast